Tawqa or Tawqan (Quechua tawqa heap, pile, -n a suffix, Hispanicized spellings Tauca, Taucán) may refer to:

 Tauca District, a district and its seat in the Ancash Region, Peru
 Lake Tauca, a former lake in Bolivia
 Tawqa, a mountain in the Calca Province, Cusco Region, Peru
 Tawqan, a mountain in the Ancash Region, Peru

See also 
 Tawqa Urqu, a mountain in the Paruro Province, Cusco Region, Peru